The Draža Mihailović Cup (DMC) is an annual Australian basketball tournament for basketball clubs with Serb ethnic affiliation. The first edition of the tournament held in 1993, it has steadily grown to encompass clubs from across the country. 

Sydney Oblilic recently won the 2022 rendition of the tournament in Wollongong, thereby establishing itself as the most successful club in DMC's history, with 11 titles to its name. At the same tournament, Obilic's star shooting guard Sveto "Steve" Gavrilovic, who previously played with the Penrith Panthers and Bankstown Bruins, in the Waratah Basketball League, was named the tournament's Most Valuable Player (MVP). 

The tournament is named after Chetnik leader Draža Mihailović, who led the first European uprising against Nazi Germany in World War II. 

Melbourne, who hosted the first rendition of the tournament in 1993, will have the honour of hosting its 30th anniversary in December 2023.

List of winners

Most Valuable Players' (MVP)

See also

External links
Obilic Basketball Club Official website

References

Basketball competitions in Australia
Recurring sporting events established in 1993
Serbian-Australian culture